James Crabe, A.S.C. (August 19, 1931 – May 2, 1989) was an American cinematographer, known for his work in the 1970s and '80s on numerous films, including Rocky, The China Syndrome, Night Shift, The Karate Kid, and Thank God It's Friday. He was a regular collaborator of director John G. Avildsen, and a two-time Primetime Emmy Award winner, in addition to being nominated for multiple ASC Awards and an Academy Award.

Biography
James Crabe was one of the few openly gay cinematographers in Hollywood. He was nominated for the Academy Award for Best Cinematography for director John G. Avildsen's The Formula (1980). He also photographed Avildsen's films Save the Tiger (1973), W.W. and the Dixie Dancekings (1975), Rocky (1976), The Karate Kid (1984), The Karate Kid Part II (1986), Happy New Year (1987) and For Keeps (1988) as well as Thank God It's Friday (1978), The China Syndrome (1979), and Police Academy 2: Their First Assignment (1985).

He won the Primetime Emmy Award for Outstanding Cinematography for a Limited Series or Movie for The Letter (1982) and was nominated for The Entertainer (1976), Eleanor and Franklin: The White House Years (1977) and his final film Baby M (1988). He won Outstanding Cinematography for a Series for The New Mike Hammer episode "More Than Murder" in 1984.

Death
On May 2, 1989, James Crabe died at his home in Sherman Oaks, California, from complications of AIDS at the age of 57. The Karate Kid Part III was dedicated to his memory.

Selected filmography
The Slime People (1965)
One Way Wahine (1965)

References

External links

1931 births
1989 deaths
American cinematographers
AIDS-related deaths in California
LGBT people from California
20th-century American LGBT people